Baha Lake (Urdu: باہا جھیل, Khowar: باہو چھت) is situated in Shandur Valley Tehsil Gupis of Ghizer District, Ghizer District, the westernmost part of the Northern Areas and northernmost territory of Pakistan. This lake is an important source of fresh water with full of trout.

Location 
Baha Lake is located in Koh-i-Ghizer of District Ghizer, Gilgit-Baltistan, Pakistan. Its direction is from north to south. To reach Baha Lake, a person must take the Karakoram Highway from Islamabad to Gilgit. And then take Gilgit-Chitral road west from Gilgit, and then continue his journey straight towards Chitral. When it comes in Langar, the main road goes toward Shandur and on the left hand side to south direction, Khukush Nallah starts. One cannot take any bike or bicycle as there are bothering trek road to reach Baha Lake. It takes 2 hours from Langar to reach at Baha Lake.

Physical appearance 
Baha Lake has sky blue colour. It is the longest natural lake in Gilgit-Baltistan. It is 5 kilometers in length and 750 meters in width. It is not an easy job for a person to complete a trip round the lake.

References

External links 
 https://books.google.com/books?isbn=443155369X
 https://www.infona.pl/resource/bwmeta1.element...ae7b.../contributors
 https://web.archive.org/web/20160709045004/http://gbepa.gog.pk/Downloads/Reports/LNYE2009.pdf
 https://visitingfun.blogspot.com/search/label/Shandur%20Pass
 https://web.archive.org/web/20150924101238/http://www.shandur.chitralstudio.com/history/
 https://www.uh.edu/~sdkhan/pubs.html
 https://wikimapia.org/15521100/Baha-Lake

Camping in Pakistan
Ghizer District
Lakes of Gilgit-Baltistan
Reservoirs in Pakistan
Lakes in Ghizer